Frankfort Township is one of twelve townships in Franklin County, Illinois, USA. As of the 2010 census, its population was 7,029 and it contained 3,362 housing units.

Geography

Cities, towns, villages
 West Frankfort (east half)

Unincorporated towns
 Deering City
 Frankfort
(This list is based on USGS data and may include former settlements.)

Extinct towns
 Greenville

Cemeteries
The township contains these thirteen cemeteries: Bonner, Clayton, County, Crawford, Joplin, Lithuanian, Melvin, Neal, Neal, Oddfellow, Saint Johns, Tower Heights and Trinity.

Major highways
  Illinois Route 149

Landmarks
 Frankfort Community Park

Demographics

School districts
 Frankfort Community Unit School District 168

Political districts
 Illinois' 12th congressional district
 State House District 117
 State Senate District 59

References
 
 United States Census Bureau 2007 TIGER/Line Shapefiles
 United States National Atlas

External links
 City-Data.com
 Illinois State Archives

Townships in Franklin County, Illinois
Townships in Illinois